Catherine Marie Daley (24 April 1955 – 2 March 2022) was a Canadian visual artist and educator located in Toronto, Ontario.

Personal life
Daley was born on 24 April 1955 in Toronto, Ontario. She died on 2 March 2022, at the age of 66.

Career
Daley earned a Bachelor of Fine Arts at the Ontario College of Art (OCA) (1973–74) and studied at the Art's Sake Inc (1979–80).  She was an associate professor at OCAD University in the Faculty of Art, where she began teaching drawing and painting in 1988.

Many of Daley's significant artworks are included in her Little Black Dress series (2001), Power Dressing Fashion series (2003), and  Dance series (2009).  Her works have been exhibited in Canada and internationally since 1980, in galleries such as the Project Gallery,
the Museum of Contemporary Canadian Art,
The Power Plant, the Southern Alberta Gallery, the Museum Dhondt Dhaenens, and Mercer Union.

Style and technique
Daley's work investigates childhood memories and explores how women are represented through image and language in modern Western culture. Her artwork draws inspiration from this imagery and her resulting drawings are almost exclusively black pastel and charcoal on translucent vellum that reveal "disembodied gowns, tutus and billowy party frocks..."

Collections
 National Gallery of Canada, Ottawa, Ontario   
 Canada Council Art Bank, Ottawa, Ontario
 The Art Gallery of Ontario, Toronto, Ontario
 Tom Thomson Art Gallery, Owen Sound, Ontario

Bibliography
 Feinstein, Roni. 1996. "Cathy Daley at Paul Petro."  Art in America 84 (February): 99-100. .
Osborne, Catherine. 1996. "Cathy Daley." Parachute no. 84 (Oct-Nov): 69-70. 
Enright, Robert. 1999. "A Sense of an Ending: Dress Me Up, Dress Me Down," Border Crossing no. 69 (Spring): 19(1):4-5.

References

Further reading

 Campbell, Nancy. (1989) Drawn From/Drawn Upon C Magazine, Issue 23, p. 72-74.
 Miller, Earl (1996) Cathy Daley: Paul Petro Contemporary Art C Magazine, Issue 48, p. 54.

External links
 
 

1955 births
2022 deaths
20th-century Canadian women artists
21st-century Canadian women artists
Artists from Toronto
OCAD University alumni